Francesco Nullo was one of four s built for the  (Royal Italian Navy) in the 1920s. Completed in 1927, she served in World War II.

Design and description
The Sauro-class destroyers were enlarged and improved versions of the preceding  . Their complement was 8–10 officers and 146 enlisted men.

The Sauros were powered by two Parsons geared steam turbines, each driving one propeller shaft using steam supplied by three Yarrow boilers.

Their main battery consisted of four  guns in two twin-gun turrets, one each fore and aft of the superstructure. Anti-aircraft (AA) defense for the Sauro-class ships was provided by a pair of  AA guns in single mounts amidships and a pair of  machine guns. They were equipped with six  torpedo tubes in two triple mounts amidships. The Sauros could also carry 52 mines.

Construction and career
Francesco Nullo was laid down by Cantieri navali del Quarnaro at their Fiume shipyard on 9 October 1924, launched on 14 November 1925 and commissioned on 15 April 1927.

Citations

Bibliography

External links
  Classe Sauro Marina Militare website

Sauro-class destroyers
World War II destroyers of Italy
1925 ships
Ships built by Cantieri navali Odero
Maritime incidents in October 1940